"Awkward" is a song recorded by Australian indie pop band San Cisco and released in September 2011 as the lead single from their second extended play of the same name (2012).

In January 2012, the song was voted number 7 in the Triple J Hottest 100, 2011, and following this result, debuted and peaked at number 32 on the ARIA Singles Chart in February 2012 and was certified platinum in Australia in 2013. The song was later also voted number 78 in the Triple J Hottest 100 of the 2010s.

The song is a story of a young man stalking his crush, with duelling vocals by Jordi Davieson and Scarlett Stevens.

At the 2012 West Australian Music Industry Awards, the song won Most Popular Music Video and Most Popular Single.

In 2020, the song was used as part of an advertising campaign by KFC Australia.

Reception
Music Feeds called the song "an unmistakable pop gem" while Christiana Bartolini from Indie Shuffle described the song as "simple, upbeat and actually really cute".

Charts

Certification

References

2011 singles
2011 songs
San Cisco songs
Songs written by Scarlett Stevens